Mischler may refer to:

Mischler Financial Group, American investment bank and institutional brokerage
Baptiste Mischler (born 1997), French middle-distance runner
Martial Mischler (born 1964), French wrestler
Norman Mischler (1920–2009), English first-class cricketer and British Indian Army officer
Graig Mischler (born 1978), American hockey player; see 2000 Hockey East Men's Ice Hockey Tournament

See also
 Mischer (disambiguation)